Frank Alexander Wetmore (June 18, 1886 – December 7, 1978) was an American ornithologist and avian paleontologist.  He was the sixth Secretary of the Smithsonian Institution.

Early life and education 
The son of a Country Physician, Frank Alexander Wetmore was born in North Freedom, Wisconsin. Developing an interest in birds at an early age, he made his first field journal entry (a pelican seen while on vacation in 1894) at the age of eight. By 1900, Wetmore published his first paper "My Experience with a Red-headed Woodpecker," in the magazine Bird-Lore. To further his education Wetmore enrolled at the University of Kansas in 1905. During his studies there he did a stint as an assistant in the University Museum, under the direction of Charles D. Bunker. Alexander Wetmore later received his BA from the University of Kansas in 1912; finally receiving his MS in 1916 and his  PhD in 1920 from George Washington University. Wetmore began federal service in 1910, working for the Biological Survey of the Department of Agriculture. In 1915, he researched the use of lead shot in causing death in waterfowl. His paleontological research led to his work on  the fossil birds Palaeochenoides mioceanus and  Nesotrochis debooyi.

From April 1923 to July 1924, Wetmore was the lead scientist of the Tanager Expedition, a series of five biological surveys to study the flora, fauna and geology of the Northwestern Hawaiian Islands, Johnston Atoll and Wake Island. In 1924, Wetmore joined the Smithsonian Institution as the superintendent of the National Zoo in Washington, D.C.  In 1925, Wetmore was appointed assistant secretary of the Smithsonian Institution, becoming secretary between 1945 and 1952. In 1929 he participated in the Pinchot South Sea Expedition. In 1939 he was elected a Corresponding Member of the Royal Australasian Ornithologists Union

He wrote A Systematic Classification for the Birds of the World (1930, revised in 1951 and 1960).  This Wetmore Order received widespread acceptance, remaining popular until the end of the twentieth century. From 1944 to 1946 Wetmore served as the 15th president of The Explorers Club. Between 1946 and 1966 Wetmore made annual trips to Panama to study and collect specimens of the birds of the Isthmus.  His 4-volume magnum opus, Birds of the Republic of Panama, was published by the Smithsonian between 1965 and 1984, the last volume appearing posthumously. He also served on the boards of trustees of Science Service, now known as Society for Science & the Public, from 1946 to 1953, and of the National Geographic Society, where he served successively as vice chairman, acting chairman, and chairman emeritus of the Committee for Research and Exploration, from 1933 until his death, in his final years as a trustee emeritus.

Several taxa of birds have been named in his honor, including the Cretaceous genus Alexornis and the tanagers Wetmorethraupis sterrhopteron and Buthraupis wetmorei. Insects, mammals, amphibians, mollusks, and one plant (an Argentinian cactus), as well as a bridge in Panama and the Wetmore Glacier in the Antarctic, have also been named after him. Wetmore is commemorated in the scientific names of one species and two subspecies of reptiles: Pholidoscelis wetmorei, Uromacer frenatus wetmorei, and Anolis brevirostris wetmorei.

In 1953 he married Annie Beatrice van der Biest Thielan, who became guarantor of the American Ornithologists' Union after his death in 1978. His papers and an oral history interview are held at the Smithsonian Institution.

References

External links 

 Biography at Smithsonian's National Museum of Natural History
 Alexander Wetmore from the Smithsonian Institution Archives
 Wetmore, Alexander materials at Internet Archive
 Alexander Wetmore Oral History Interviews from the Smithsonian Institution Archives

1886 births
1978 deaths
American ornithologists
Secretaries of the Smithsonian Institution
George Washington University alumni
People from Sauk County, Wisconsin
Tanager Expedition
Zoo curators
People from Glen Echo, Maryland
20th-century American zoologists